The SEAT 1500 was a Spanish-built 6-seater model of saloon and estate cars, based on the Italian Fiat 2300 and using a 1481 cc engine from the Fiat 1500. The 1500 was the successor to the SEAT 1400 C; it was manufactured from 1963 to 1973, with the five door estate ("Familiar") version arriving in 1965. Apart from the larger engine, differences between the 1500 and the C version of its predecessor were limited to minor details such as a speedometer that now read up to 140 km/h (87 mph).

There was also a '1500 pick-up' offered, and the coach builder ONECA developed a long-wheelbase 'pullman' version.  A total of 134,766 cars were built.

Engine
Engine options were initially restricted to a 1481 cc petrol fuelled water cooled unit, driving the rear wheels via a four speed all syncromesh gearbox. With this engine a top speed of 145 km/h (90 mph) was claimed. After 1968, demand for petrol engined versions of the SEAT 1500 fell away with the introduction of the SEAT 124, a more modern design based on the Fiat 124 with a much better power-to-weight ratio.

From 1969, both 1.8 and 2-litre diesel versions of the SEAT 1500 were offered, and most would be used as taxis. According to one report this version took nearly 50 seconds to reach 100 km/h (62 mph), but fuel cost savings were impressive, helped by the lower level of sales tax on diesel fuel. These were the first diesel powered saloons manufactured in Spain. Fiat were not producing diesel engines at this stage. Engines were supplied by Mercedes-Benz and Perkins Engines. The diesel engines supplied to SEAT by Mercedes-Benz were versions of the four cylinder diesel engines that powered Mercedes diesel engined cars in many corners of Europe in the 1960s.

Body
The Fiat based body used the Pininfarina styled boxy design which had since 1959 featured on the 'C' version of SEAT's 1400: it was  broadly similar to the designs provided by the same designer to Peugeot and BMC at this time.  The car originally had a single pair of headlights at the front, but from 1969, double headlamps similar to those fitted on the Fiat 2300 were a feature of the SEAT 1500s.   The post 1969 twin headlight models acquired the soubriquet 'Bifaro' in Spain.

External links

SEAT 1500 history (Spanish)
Museo Seat (Spanish, Catalan, English, German)

1500
Cars introduced in 1963
Cars of Spain
Station wagons